High hat and variants may refer to:

High hat 
Top hat, a tall, flat-crowned, broad-brimmed hat, worn by men
High Hat (6 String Drag album)
High Hat (Boy George album)
Pareques acuminatus, a species of fish in the family Sciaenidae, also known as drums or croakers 
High-hat triplefin, a species of fish in the genus Enneapterygius
High Hat (1927 film), an American film directed by James Ashmore Creelman
High Hat (1937 film), an  American film directed by Clifford Sanforth

Hi-hat 
Hi-hat, a type of cymbal and stand, developed for and used as one of the standard components of a drum kit
Hi hat (photography), a type of fixed tripod
Hi-Hat (choreographer), choreographer of hip-hop dance from New York City
Hi Hat, Kentucky, an unincorporated community in Floyd County, Kentucky, United States
Hi-Hat (venue), a performance hall in Boston at which the Jazz at the Hi-Hat album by Sonny Stitt was recorded

Hihat 
Nihad Hihat (born 1995), Algerian volleyball player
 Stanley Hihat